Nocturne is a 2019 Dutch drama film directed by Viktor van der Valk.

The film screened at the 2019 International Film Festival Rotterdam.

Cast 

 Vincent van der Valk as Alex
 Reinout Scholten van Aschat as Ferdinand
 Simone van Bennekom as Anna
 Tom Dewispelaere as Michael
 Bien de Moor as Mother

References

External links 
 

2019 films
2010s Dutch-language films
Dutch drama films
2019 drama films